Co-op Energy is a British energy supply company based in Warwick that began trading in 2010. It sells renewable electricity (some from community-owned sources) and gas to its ethically concerned member owner/customers and is a established large operator, an alternative to the Big Six energy suppliers. Given that its parent is Midcounties Co-operative, it is the only co-operative supplier in the British market, meaning members can receive dividends and/or interest on their trade with the business. Since August 2019, energy supply, billing and customer service have been operated by Octopus Energy.

Co-op Energy forms part of the society's Utilities Group following the merger of The Phone Co-op and the Midcounties in 2016. Combined mobile, broadband, and energy accounts are available.

History 
Co-op Energy launched in 2010 as an alternative to the Big Six energy suppliers. The company has three sites: one office in Warwick and two in Walsall.

In 2012, Co-op Energy was awarded the Which? Positive Change Award, which recognises a company that has made significant changes to give its customers a better deal.

In 2014, User Chooser was launched by Co-op Energy to allow customers to choose where their electricity is sourced from. This service won the EU Sustainable Energy Europe Award in 2015.

A problematic upgrade to its online customer service and billing system in 2015 resulted in numerous problems and a large backlog in dealing with issues. By the end of 2015 it was the most complained about utility company, measured in complaints per thousand customers.  By the end of 2016 these issues had been resolved and the company was paying out £1.8 million in compensation to customers.

On 2 October 2020, Ofgem published its notice of proposal to issue a Final Order (FO) on Co-op Energy in accordance with Section 25(1) of the Electricity Act 1989 (EA89).

Acquisitions 
In November 2016, Co-op Energy announced that it would take on all 160,000 customers of collapsed firm GB Energy on their existing price tariff. Ofgem said it had chosen Co-op Energy after "a competitive process to get the best deal possible". All GB Energy's staff were to be transferred on the same terms to Co-op Energy.

In May 2018, Co-op Energy announced that it had acquired Flow Energy, which had approximately 130,000 customers at the time. Co-op Energy said that Flow Energy would remain a separate brand within Co-op Energy and keep its own tariffs.

Partnership with Octopus Energy 
In August 2019, Midcounties Co-operative agreed a partnership with Octopus Energy. Customers of GB Energy and Flow Energy became Octopus customers. The Co-op Energy brand continues, with customer accounts operated by Octopus, while Midcounties retains responsibility for acquiring new customers.

Membership 
Members of Co-op Energy receive a share of the company's profits, and can elect the board of directors and attend the annual general meeting and regional meetings. They may also enjoy rights to trade with their own community operated childcare nurseries, online pharmacy, funeral parlours, personal travel agent consortium and grocery stores.

Members wishing to stand for election to the board of directors of Co-op Energy need evidence of ongoing trade and to have held membership (which costs £1) for a qualifying period.

See also
 British co-operative movement

References

External links 
 

British companies established in 2010
Electric power companies of the United Kingdom
Utilities of the United Kingdom
Companies based in Warwick
Consumers' co-operatives of the United Kingdom
Energy companies established in 2010